Diego Tur (born 3 October 1971) is a former Danish professional footballer, who played most of his career as a central defender for F.C. Copenhagen, between 1992 and 2002. He played 18 games for various Danish youth national teams, and was awarded Danish under-17 Player of the Year in 1987. Diego Tur has a Danish mother and a Spanish father.

Biography
Born in Copenhagen, Tur started playing football with local club BS 72 Albertslund as a boy, but at age 15 he moved to B 1903. Tur represented various Danish national youth teams, and played a combined total of 18 national youth team games. In 1987, he won the Danish under-17 Player of the Year award. He debuted for B 1903's senior team in 1989, and on October 22, 1991 he was part of B 1903's sensational and legendary 6-2 UEFA Cup win over the major German club FC Bayern Munich at Gentofte Stadion.

On July 1, 1992, B 1903 was merged with Kjøbenhavns Boldklub to form new club F.C. Copenhagen (FCK), and Tur became a part of the FCK squad. In its first year of existence, FCK won the 1993 Danish Superliga championship, and Tur made his debut for the club on April 11, 1993 in the 2-0 victory over Næstved BK. Tur represented F.C. Copenhagen in 11 matches in the championship season. The following years did not bring as much success in the Superliga, but Tur was a part of the FCK teams which won the 1995 and 1997 Danish Cup trophies.

From his FCK debut until his last match for the club on April 22, 2001 against Akademisk Boldklub, Tur made 225 appearances for F.C. Copenhagen divided amongst 192 domestic league appearances, 17 domestic cup appearances and 16 European appearances. He scored 12 goals in the domestic league, one goal in the domestic cup and two goals in the UEFA Cup Winners' Cup. During Tur's time at F.C. Copenhagen, he only received one red card, which was on May 19, 1996 in a Danish Superliga match against Ikast fS.

In a fan vote, which was held during the winter of 2006, Tur was voted into the F.C.Copenhagen Hall of fame as the 18th best player to have represented F.C. Copenhagen in the club's first 14 years.

After winning the 2000-01 Superliga championship with FCK, Tur went on loan to Copenhagen rivals Akademisk Boldklub (AB), due to a dwindling amount of playing time for FCK. After one season at AB, he moved to Jutland for the 2002-03 Superliga season, to represent AaB of Aalborg. He played one season at AaB, before heading back to Copenhagen, to represent newly promoted team BK Frem in the 2003-04 Superliga season. He debuted for Frem on July 27, 2003 against Odense Boldklub. BK Frem finished second-last in the Danish Superliga, and was relegated at the end of the season. Tur retired from professional football, after his last match on May 23, 2004, where he represented BK Frem against Brøndby IF.

In his retirement, Diego Tur represents FC Roskilde in the Danish 2nd Division East as an amateur.

Tur was in Thailand during the Indian Ocean tsunami on December 26, 2004 but survived.

In the fall of 2006 Tur won the Danish edition of Expedition Robinson, which was broadcast on TV3 Denmark. With the honour was also a money prize of DKK 1 million.

From July 16, 2007 he will start as sales assistant in F.C. Copenhagen.

November 2010 - Diego Tur is a father of two children, a new baby boy and little girl, residing in Copenhagen, where he continues to play football with former FCK players.

Honours
1987 Danish under-17 Player of the Year
Danish Superliga: 1992-93 and 2000-01
Danish Cup: 1994-95 and 1996–97
Danish Super Cup: 1995

References

External links
Danish national team profile
 FCK profile
 AaB profile
 Boldklubben Frem profile 

1971 births
Living people
Footballers from Copenhagen
Danish men's footballers
Denmark under-21 international footballers
F.C. Copenhagen players
AaB Fodbold players
Boldklubben Frem players
Danish people of Spanish descent
F.C. Copenhagen non-playing staff
Ikast FS players
Association football central defenders